Chris Martin (born January 4, 1990) is a former American football offensive tackle. He was signed by the Houston Texans as an undrafted free agent in 2014. He played college football at University of Central Florida. Martin was a member of five different NFL franchises in three seasons before signing to play in the CFL.

Personal life
A native of Fort Walton Beach, Florida, Martin attended Choctawhatchee High School and graduated in 2008.

College career
Martin played at UCF from 2009-2013. He also played sparingly at tight end for the Knights.

Professional career

Houston Texans
Martin originally signed with the Houston Texans as an undrafted free agent in 2014.

New England Patriots
Martin was signed to the New England Patriots practice squad in August 2014. He was released on October 13, 2014.

Houston Texans (II)
Martin was signed to the Houston Texans practice squad on Nov. 12, and he was later released on Nov. 25.

San Francisco 49ers
Martin was signed to the San Francisco 49ers practice squad in December 2014. On December 30, 2014, he was signed a future contract. On June 15, 2015, he was waived by the 49ers.

Miami Dolphins
Martin was signed by the Miami Dolphins on July 28, 2015. On August 16, 2015, he was waived by the Dolphins.

New England Patriots (II)
On August 18, 2015, Martin was claimed off waivers by the New England Patriots. On September 4, 2015, he was waived by the Patriots.

Buffalo Bills
Martin was signed to the Buffalo Bills practice squad in September 2015. On November 6, 2015, he was released by the Bills.

Miami Dolphins (II)
On November 18, 2015, Martin was signed to the Dolphins' practice squad. On November 24, 2015, he was released.

Buffalo Bills (II)
Martin was signed by the Bills. On September 2, 2016, he was released by the Bills as part of final roster cuts. He was re-signed to their practice squad on September 12. He was released from the practice squad on September 19.

Ottawa Redblacks 
On May 24, 2018 the Ottawa Redblacks of the Canadian Football League (CFL) announced the signing of Martin.

Orlando Apollos
In 2018, Martin signed with the Orlando Apollos for the 2019 season.

Ottawa Redblacks
After the AAF ceased operations in April 2019, Martin re-signed with the Ottawa Redblacks on May 8, 2019.

On August 10, 2021, Martin would be featured in the documentary about the AAF, Alliances Broken. Here he would announce retirement from football.

References

External links 
UCF bio

1990 births
Living people
People from Fort Walton Beach, Florida
American football offensive tackles
Houston Texans players
Buffalo Bills players
San Francisco 49ers players
New England Patriots players
Miami Dolphins players
UCF Knights football players
Choctawhatchee High School alumni
Ottawa Redblacks players
Orlando Apollos players